Cryptosporidium fragile is a parasite which infects amphibians. The oocysts have an irregular, shape (subspherical to elliptical) and surface. The developing parasite is found in the gastric epithelial cells.

It was first discovered in a black-spined toad (Duttaphrynus melanostictus) originating from Malaysia. C. fragile is not associated with disease in humans.

References

Conoidasida